Matteo Coppini (born 5 May 1989) is a Sammarinese footballer who last played for Campitello.

He has been capped by the San Marino national football team and made his international debut in 2010.

References

1989 births
Living people
Sammarinese footballers
San Marino international footballers

Association football midfielders